Randy Tolsma (born May 4, 1966) is an American former stock car racing driver. Tolsma began his racing career in go-karts at the age of nine, before moving into sprint cars, running as high as USAC, where he won four track championships. He failed to qualify for the 1996 Indianapolis 500 and then shifted his focus to NASCAR and made his first start in the Craftsman Truck Series later that year. From then until 2002, he made 107 starts in the Truck Series. He also made 13 Busch Series starts in 2000 and 2001.

Tolsma made his NASCAR debut in 1996 at Phoenix International Raceway. Driving the #61 IWX Motor Freight Chevrolet Silverado for Steve Coulter's Xpress Motorsports team, he started 16th but finished 29th after wrecking early in the race. Tolsma returned to the team in 1997, running a limited schedule for Coulter. Running 15 races, he had 5 top-tens, including his first career win at Mesa Marin Raceway, where he held off fellow rookie Stacy Compton for the final twelve laps. Tolsma teamed with Coulter to run full-time in 1998, grabbing his first career pole at Indianapolis Raceway Park, and had ten top-ten finishes. Late in the season, Coulter shut down his Truck team, and Tolsma split the year driving for Liberty Racing, Phil Bonifield, and Dominic Dobson. He ran 26 races total and finished 14th in points.

For 1999, Tolsma signed to drive the new #25 Supergard Motor Oil Dodge Ram for Impact Motorsports. He sat on the pole in the season-opening race at Homestead and posted ten top-ten finishes throughout the course of the season, finishing eleventh in points. In 2000, Tolsma grabbed fifteen top-tens and a win at Nashville. He finished eighth in points. He also made his Busch Series debut at Dover, driving the #25 Lance Snacks Chevy for Team Rensi Motorsports. He started 38th and finishing 28th.

After Impact began running into financial problems, Tolsma left to drive for Rensi's truck team. Unfortunately, their #16 was unsponsored, and despite Tolsma being in the top-ten in points, the team folded after the Power Stroke Diesel 200. He finished out the year driving twelve races for Rensi's Busch team, his best finish an 18th at Memphis. He was unable to keep his ride for the 2002 season, and ran one Truck race at Martinsville, where he finished 18th. He has not raced in NASCAR since.

Motorsports career results

IRL IndyCar Series

NASCAR
(key) (Bold – Pole position awarded by qualifying time. Italics – Pole position earned by points standings or practice time. * – Most laps led.)

Busch Series

Craftsman Truck Series

References

External links
 Archived version of Randy Tolsma's home page
 

1966 births
Living people
NASCAR drivers
People from Meridian, Idaho
Racing drivers from Idaho
ASCAR drivers
USAC Silver Crown Series drivers